Congregation Maghen Abraham in Montreal is a Sephardi Jewish Lebanese community located in the district of St-Kévin in Montreal, Quebec, Canada.

It is named in honor of the Maghen Abraham Synagogue in Beirut, Lebanon. The congregation was founded to meet the needs of Jewish Lebanese families moving to Montreal.

In the sanctuary, Torah is read to the congregation from the bimah and the Torah scrolls are stored in the aron kodesh on the east wall. The congregation face towards the east, and Jerusalem, in praying. The ornamentation features symbols such as Stars of David, signs of the zodiac and natural forms.

References

External links
  (French and English)

Lebanese-Canadian culture
Lebanese-Jewish diaspora
Middle Eastern-Canadian culture in Quebec
Jewish organizations established in 1951
Sephardi Jewish culture in Canada
Sephardi synagogues
Synagogues in Montreal
1951 establishments in Quebec